Irving Hill (February 6, 1915 – March 18, 1998) was a United States district judge of the United States District Court for the Central District of California.

Education and career

Born in Lincoln, Nebraska, Hill received a Bachelor of Arts degree from the University of Nebraska–Lincoln in 1936 and a Bachelor of Laws from Harvard Law School in 1939. He was an attorney for the United States Department of Justice in Washington, D.C. in 1939. He was an assistant to the general counsel of the Bonneville Power Administration in Portland, Oregon from 1939 to 1942. He was a Special Assistant United States Attorney of the United States Department of Justice in Washington, D.C. from 1942 to 1946. He was a United States Naval Reserve Lieutenant, J.G., towards the end of World War II, from 1944 to 1946. He was than a legal adviser to the United States delegation to the United Nations Economic and Social Council in 1946, and was in private practice in Beverly Hills, California from 1946 to 1961. He was a judge of the Los Angeles Superior Court from 1961 to 1965.

Federal judicial service

On May 18, 1965, Hill was nominated by President Lyndon B. Johnson to a seat on the United States District Court for the Southern District of California vacated by Judge William Carey Mathes. Hill was confirmed by the United States Senate on June 9, 1965, and received his commission on June 10, 1965. On September 18, 1966, Hill was reassigned by operation of law to the United States District Court for the Central District of California, to a new seat established by 80 Stat. 75. He served as Chief Judge of that court from 1979 to 1980. He assumed senior status on October 15, 1980, and served in that capacity until his death, on March 18, 1998, in Los Angeles.

See also
 List of Jewish American jurists

References

Sources
 

1915 births
1998 deaths
University of Nebraska alumni
Harvard Law School alumni
California state court judges
Judges of the United States District Court for the Southern District of California
Judges of the United States District Court for the Central District of California
United States district court judges appointed by Lyndon B. Johnson
20th-century American judges
United States Navy officers
20th-century American lawyers
Assistant United States Attorneys